Glycyphagidae is a family of mites in the  order Astigmata. There are more than 25 genera and 100 described species in Glycyphagidae.

The natural habitat of most species of this family is nests of rodents, insectivores, and opossums, although many now live among humans in stored food or housing.

Genera
These 27 genera belong to the family Glycyphagidae:

 Apodemopus Fain, 1967
 Asiolabidophorus Lukoschus, Gerrits & Fain, 1977
 Austroglycyphagus
 Dermacarus Haller, 1880
 Diamesoglyphus Zachvatkin, 1941
 Dipodomyopus Fain & Lukoschus, 1978
 Eupygopus Lukoschus, Rothuizen & Fain, 1977
 Glycyphagoides
 Glycyphagus Hering, 1838
 Gohieria Oudemans, 1939
 Hypodectes Filippi, 1861
 Labidophorus Kramer, 1877
 Lepidoglyphus Zakhvatkin, 1936
 Lophioglyphus Volgin, 1964
 Marsupialichus Fain, 1967
 Mediolabidophorus Fain & Lukoschus, 1978
 Melesodectes Fain & Lukoschus, 1968
 Metalabidophorus Fain, 1967
 Microlabidopus Fain, 1967
 Neoxenoryctes Fain & Philips, 1977
 Orycteroxenus Zachvatkin, 1941
 Scalopacarus Fain & Whitaker, 1973
 Soriculopus Fain & Lukoschus, 1980
 Xenocastor Zachvatkin, 1941
 Xenoryctes Zachvatkin, 1941
 † Marmosopus Fain & Lukoschus, 1977
 † Neotetracopus Fain, 1969

References

Further reading

External links

 

Acari
Acari families